Terre-de-Haut Island (also formerly known as Petite Martinique) is the easternmost island in the Îles des Saintes, part of the archipelago of Guadeloupe.  Like name of neighboring Terre-de-Bas, name Terre-de-Haut comes from the maritime vocabulary, which called the islands exposed to the "highland" winds and those protected from the wind, "lowlands".

Geography

Besides Terre-de-Bas, several small islands surround Terre-de-Haut. It is an island of  dominated in the north by Morne Mire hill and Morel hill.

Morel is on the North of the island, between the bay of Marigot and the bay of Pompierre. There is an ancient fortress there, Caroline battery.

The Chameau , in the southwest, is the highest elevation in the archipelago. It is covered with forest. On the summit, there is a watchtower, called La tour modèle. Chameau is the property of the Conservatoire du littoral and is a protected site category IV IUCN.

History
The first recorded European colonizer was Christopher Columbus in November 1493. He chose the name that the economic powers of the world consider valid.

First colonist arrived in 1648.
In 1666, the church Notre Dame de l'Assomption was built.

The strategic position of Petite Martinique (its former name) was important. 
In August 1666 French victory over the British ensured French sovereignty over these islands. However, from 1759 to 1815, alternations of British and French Dominions.
In 1777 France built the defensive system Fort Napoléon des Saintes. 
In April 1782 the Battle of the Saintes.
The British, who occupied les Saintes in 1809, kept Fort Joséphine and added water butt to it.

From the later French dominion it became a penitentiary from 1851, but it was ravaged by a hurricane in 1865. It continued however to welcome convicts on the way towards Îles du Salut, in French Guiana until 1902.

In 1871, Îlet à Cabrit became a place of quarantine: a lazaretto, was opened instead of the penitentiary.

The local vocabulary says: "to go up" to move towards the windward quartier (to Fort Napoléon) and "to go down" to move towards the leeward quartier (to Pain-de-sucre).

Demographics 
The low quantitative precipitation forecast do not allow the establishment of agriculture. Few slaves were brought onto these islands. The population is constituted historically by Bretons, Normans and by inhabitants of Poitou who came to fish.

In 2017 the population of Terre-de-Haut was 1,532, with a density of population of 255 inhabitants/km2. The number of households was 676.

Populated areas 
The oldest settlements are the villages of Mouillage and Fond-du curé.  The population is spread among 20 quartiers, grouped into two halves:

See also

Fort Napoléon des Saintes
Dependencies of Guadeloupe

Gallery

References

Islands of Guadeloupe
Inhabited islands of Îles des Saintes